Total equivalent warming impact (TEWI) is besides global warming potential measure used to express contributions to global warming.

It is defined as sum of the direct emissions (chemical) and indirect emissions (energy use) of greenhouse gases.

References

Sources

 

Greenhouse gas emissions